Hendrik Pothoven (25 December 1725 – 29 January 1807) was an 18th-century drawer and painter from the Northern Netherlands.

According to the RKD he was a pupil of Frans de Bakker and Philip van Dijk. He was a follower of Frans van Mieris and Adriaen van de Velde; he is best known for his portraits, landscapes, and engravings. He worked in his native Amsterdam until 1764, when he moved to The Hague, where he later died.

References

Hendrik Pothoven on Artnet

1725 births
1807 deaths
18th-century Dutch painters
18th-century Dutch male artists
Dutch male painters
Painters from Amsterdam